Jieyuan Subdistrict is a subdistrict situated on the south side of Hongqiao District, Tianjin, China. It borders Shaogongzhuang Subdistrict to the northwest, Santiaoshi Subdistrict to the northeast and east, Gulou and Lingdangge Subdistricts to the south, and Changhong Subdistrict to the west. In the year 2010, It had 33,212 people residing under its administration as of 2010.

During Qianlong Emperor's visit, the canola in this area were blooming. The region was given the name Jieyuan as a result. The subdistrict was formally created in 1998.

Geography 
Jieyuan subdistrict is located along the southern bank of Nanyun River.

Administrative divisions 
In 2021, Jieyuan Subdistrict consisted of 8 residential communities. They are:

Gallery

See also 

 List of township-level divisions of Tianjin

References 

Township-level divisions of Tianjin
Hongqiao District, Tianjin